Al-Muzaffar Mahmud may refer to:

Al-Muzaffar II Mahmud, Ayyubid emir of Hama (1229–1244)
Al-Muzaffar III Mahmud, Ayyubid emir of Hama (1284–1300)